Sevin  is a common feminine Turkish given name. In Turkish, "Sevin" means "Love her!" and/or "Rejoice!".

Sevin is also a Kurdish feminine name, derived from the Kurdish word Sev which means apple.

People
 Sevin Okyay, Turkish literary critic, journalist, author, regular columnist and a prolific translator.
 Fadik Sevin Atasoy, Turkish actor who received Best Supporting Actress in 42nd Antalya Golden Orange Film Festival. (See Turkish Wikipedia article)

Turkish feminine given names